Brahim Hammouche (born 17 May 1971) is a French physician and politician of the Democratic Movement (MoDem) who has been serving as a member of the National Assembly since the 2017 elections, representing Moselle.

Early life
Hammouche moved to France in 1973. He worked as a doctor at the head of the psychiatric ward at Hayange Hospital.

Political career
Hammouche belonged to the Socialist Party until 2005 before joining the MoDem.

Hammouche was elected to the French National Assembly on 18 June 2017, representing the 8th of Moselle.

In the National Assembly, Hammouche served on the Committee on Social Affairs. He is President of the France-Luxembourg Friendship Group.

He lost his seat in the first round of the 2022 French legislative election.

References

1971 births
Living people
Deputies of the 15th National Assembly of the French Fifth Republic
Democratic Movement (France) politicians
Algerian emigrants to France
21st-century French politicians